A. japonica  may refer to:
 Acidia japonica, a fruit fly species
 Actinochaetopteryx japonica, a tachinid fly species
 Acromantis japonica, the Japanese boxer mantis, a praying mantis species found in Japan, Korea, Taiwan and China
 Alauda japonica, the Japanese skylark, a bird species endemic to Japan
 Alternaria japonica, a plant pathogen species
 Ameromassaria japonica, a fungus species
 Amycolatopsis japonica, a high-GC content bacterium species in the genus Amycolatopsis 
 Anguilla japonica, the Japanese eel, a fish species found in Japan, Korea, Vietnam, the East China Sea and the northern Philippines
 Architeuthis japonica, a giant squid species
 Ardisia japonica, a plant species native to eastern Asia, in eastern China, Japan and Korea
 Arhopala japonica, the Japanese oakblue, a butterfly species found in Japan, Riu Kiu, the Korean Peninsula and Taiwan
 Artemisia japonica, the otoko yomogi, a plant species in the genus Artemisia
 Aucuba japonica, the spotted laurel, a shrub species native to Japan and China

Synonyms
 Aralia japonica, a synonym for Fatsia japonica, the fatsi or Japanese aralia, a plant species native to southern Japan

See also
 Japonica (disambiguation)